Coup de Genie (foaled May 7, 1991), which means "Stroke of Genius" in French, is an American-bred Thoroughbred racehorse, winner of the 1993 Prix de la Salamandre. She is the sister of Machiavellian.

Career

Coup de Genie's first race was on July 1, 1993 in Évry, where she came in 2nd place.

Her first win was a Group 3 win in the Prix de Cabourg on August 1, 1993.

She was again victorious, this time winning the Group 1 1993 Prix Morny on August 22, 1993.

Coup de Genie's luck did not stop there as for the 3rd time in 7 weeks, she won again. This time she won the Group 1 1993 Prix de la Salamandre.

Coup de Genie's last win came on April 5, 1994 when she won the Group 3 1994 Prix Imprudence.

Coup de Genie's last race was on September 18, 1994, where she finished in 4th at 1994 Prix du Pin.

Descendants
Coup de Genie's descendants include:

c = colt, f = filly

Pedigree

References

1991 racehorse births
Racehorses bred in Kentucky
Racehorses trained in France
Thoroughbred family 2-d